Copelatus taprobanicus is a species of diving beetle endemic to Sri Lanka. It is part of the genus Copelatus in the subfamily Copelatinae of the family Dytiscidae. It was described by Wewalka & Vazirani in 1985.

Description
This oval, moderately convex beetle has a total body length of about 5 to 8 mm. Head blackish, and clypeus reddish anteriorly. Body punctation is moderate and quite regular. Pronotum blackish with reddish anterior angles. Pronotal punctation less dense and stronger, and irregular. Elytra black with reddish markings located between sixth dorsal stria and lateral margin. Reddish markings are also found in between fifth and sixth stria at the base. Elytral apices are reddish. Elytral punctation is moderate, and dense. Ventrum black whereas head and prothorax reddish and antennae, palpi and legs are reddish brown ventrally.

References

taprobanicus
Beetles described in 1985